Hiroshi Yoshino (1926 – 15 January 2014) was a Japanese poet.

Hiroshi Yoshino died from pneumonia on the night of 15 January 2014, aged 87, in Fuji, Shizuoka Prefecture.

References

1926 births
2014 deaths
People from Yamagata Prefecture
Deaths from pneumonia in Japan
20th-century Japanese poets
21st-century Japanese poets
21st-century Japanese writers